Marikina Cityhood Park is a public park along the corner of Sumulong Highway and Shoe Avenue in Marikina, Metro Manila, Philippines. It features a  concrete monument with a clock and 12 bells sourced from Italy as well as a fountain. It was unveiled in 2005 to commemorate ninth year anniversary of Marikina's cityhood.

References

Parks in Metro Manila
Buildings and structures in Marikina